The Portrait of a Man is an early work by the Italian Renaissance painter Raphael, executed c. 1500–1504. It has previously been attributed to Hans Holbein and Perugino. It his housed at the Galleria Borghese, in Rome.

See also
List of paintings by Raphael

Notes

References
 PDF in Wikimedia

External links
 

Man
Man
Paintings in the Borghese Collection